The Dyckman Street station (pronounced ) is a station on the IND Eighth Avenue Line of the New York City Subway, located at the intersection of Dyckman Street and Broadway in Inwood, within northern Manhattan. It is served by the A train at all times.

History
Dyckman Street was formerly named Dyckman Street–200th Street despite Manhattan never having a street numbered 200th. The station opened on September 10, 1932, as part of the city-operated Independent Subway System (IND)'s initial segment, the Eighth Avenue Line between Chambers Street and 207th Street. Construction of the whole line cost $191.2 million. Service at this station was provided with express service from its onset.

The station was planned to be rehabilitated as part of the 2015–2019 MTA Capital Program.

Station layout

There are four tracks and two side platforms, much like a typical local station in the subway system. The two outer tracks lead to the 207th Street terminal station while the two center tracks lead to the 207th Street Yard. The two center tracks merge with the two outer tracks south of this station and there are diamond crossovers between all four tracks to the north. They can be used for train storage, reroutes, or emergencies. During the morning rush hour, some northbound A trains terminate here before being taken out of service to the yard by switching to the center tracks north of this station.

Both platform walls have no trim line, but there are mosaic name tablets reading "DYCKMAN–200TH ST." in white sans-serif lettering on a maroon background and black border. Small "200" tile captions in white numbering on a black background run along the walls between the name tablets. Yellow I-beam columns run along both platforms at regular intervals, alternating ones having the standard black station name plate in white lettering, reading "Dyckman Street". A few column signs still read "200". There is an underpass connecting the platforms.

Exits
Each platform has one same-level fare control area and there is a crossunder inside fare control. The southbound platform has the full-time turnstile bank and token booth. There are three street stairs here, two of which are built inside buildings and go up to the northwest corner of Broadway and Dyckman Street. The other stair goes up to the southwest corner of Broadway and Riverside Drive on the northern end of Fort Tryon Park.

Since Inwood–207th Street is the next and last stop on the line, this station's fare control on the northbound platform is exit only, containing just full height turnstiles and four staircases, two of which go up to the northeast corner of Broadway and Dyckman Street and the other two to the southeast corner.

Nearby points of interest 
 Dyckman Farmhouse Museum
 Fort Tryon Park
 Inwood Hill Park

References

External links 

 
 Station Reporter — A Rockaway
 Station Reporter — A Lefferts
 The Subway Nut — Dyckman Street (A)
 Storefront entrance to Dyckman Street from Google Maps Street View
 Broadway and Riverside Drive entrance from Google Maps Street View
 Platform from Google Maps Street View

IND Eighth Avenue Line stations
New York City Subway stations in Manhattan
Railway stations in the United States opened in 1932
1932 establishments in New York City
Broadway (Manhattan)
Inwood, Manhattan
U.S. Route 9